Frank Weston may refer to:

 Frank Weston (bishop of Knaresborough) (1935–2003), English Anglican Bishop of Knaresborough
 Frank Weston (bishop of Zanzibar) (1871–1924), English Anglican Bishop of Zanzibar
 Frank Weston (golfer) (1894–1963), English golfer
 Frank W. Weston (1843–1911), English-born American architect